Emiliyan Yankov (born 2 April 1957) is a Bulgarian sports shooter. He competed in the mixed 50 metre rifle three positions event at the 1980 Summer Olympics.

References

External links
 

1957 births
Living people
Bulgarian male sport shooters
Olympic shooters of Bulgaria
Shooters at the 1980 Summer Olympics
Place of birth missing (living people)